Dihydromorin is a flavanonol, a type of flavonoid. It can be found in plants of the family Moraceae including Morus nigra (Black mulberry), in Morus alba, Maclura pomifera (Maclura aurantiaca or Osage-Orange), in the jackfruit (Artocarpus heterophyllus) and in Artocarpus dadah.

Dihydromorin is an inhibitor of tyrosinase.

See also 
 Norartocarpetin, the corresponding flavone

References 

Flavanonols
Resorcinols